Anhui province of China has one of the largest Christian populations of regions of East Asia. It includes millions of people. According to surveys conducted in 2007 and 2009, 5.30% of the population identifies as Christian. Christianity in Henan is one of the largest Christian populations in East Asia as well . The Shouters are active in the province. 
The defunct Apostolic Vicariate of Kiang-nan had a long history. The country has Persecution of Christians. Watchman Nee died a martyr in an Anhui labour-camp in 1972.

Roman Catholic dioceses with seat in Anhui 
Roman Catholic Archdiocese of Anqing
Roman Catholic Diocese of Bengbu
Roman Catholic Diocese of Wuhu

See also 
Beili Wang
Zhushenjiao
 Christianity in Anhui's neighbouring provinces
 Christianity in Henan
 Christianity in Jiangsu
 Christianity in Jiangxi
 Christianity in Shandong
 Christianity in Zhejiang

References